Monika Enterprises is a Berlin, Germany-based independent record label.

In 2001, Wallpaper magazine described the label's musical style as "[o]ccupying a twilight zone between electronic pop, easy listening and bedsit angst" and "[s]pearheading a new generation of, frequently female, electronic introspective sounds". In 2007, Resident Advisor praised it as an "ace leftfield label".

Gudrun Gut has stated that the label was named after a deceased goldfish of hers.

Artists (selection) 
 AGF
 Barbara Morgenstern
 Cobra Killer
 Figurine
 Gudrun Gut
 Natalie Beridze
 Quarks

Compilations 
 Monika Werkstatt (16 June 17) 
 Musik fürs Wohnzimmer
 Santa Monika
 Raumschiff Monika
 Monika Force
 4 Women No Cry Vol.1
 4 Women No Cry Vol.2
 4 Women No Cry Vol.3

See also 
 List of record labels

References

External links 
 Homepage
 Monika Enterprise on myspace
 Monika Enterprise on discogs

Record labels established in 1997
Electronic music record labels
Electronic dance music record labels
German independent record labels